The 1962 North Dakota State Bison football team was an American football team that represented North Dakota State University during the 1962 NCAA College Division football season as a member of the North Central Conference. In their sixth year under head coach Bob Danielson, the team compiled a 0–10 record.

Schedule

References

North Dakota State
North Dakota State Bison football seasons
College football winless seasons
North Dakota State Bison football